Chicago and Alton Railroad Depot at Higginsville, also known as the C & A Depot, is a historic train station located at Higginsville, Lafayette County, Missouri.  It was built in 1888-1889 by the Chicago and Alton Railroad, and is a 1 1/2-story, Stick style frame building.  It features projecting eaves supported by large brackets and exterior walls faced with vertical boards, battens and horizontal clapboards.

It was listed on the National Register of Historic Places in 1987.

References

Higginsville
Former railway stations in Missouri
Railway stations on the National Register of Historic Places in Missouri
Stick-Eastlake architecture in the United States
Railway stations in the United States opened in 1889
National Register of Historic Places in Lafayette County, Missouri